Zavar-e Halkeh (also Romanized as Zavār-e Ḩalkeh; also known as Zavār) is a village in Sarduiyeh Rural District, Sarduiyeh District, Jiroft County, Kerman Province, Iran. At the 2006 census, its population was 122, in 16 families.

References 

Populated places in Jiroft County